Elis Ragnar Furuhjelm (12 October 1879 – 15 November 1944) was a Finnish astronomer and politician, born in Oulu. He was Deputy Minister of Finance from 14 December 1932 to 21 April 1933. He was a member of the Parliament of Finland from 1917 until his death in Helsinki in 1944, representing the Swedish People's Party of Finland (SFP). During the Continuation War, he was one of the signatories of the "Petition of the Thirty-three", which was presented to President Ryti by members of the Peace opposition on 20 August 1943.

References

1879 births
1944 deaths
People from Oulu
People from Oulu Province (Grand Duchy of Finland)
Swedish People's Party of Finland politicians
Ministers of Finance of Finland
Members of the Parliament of Finland (1917–19)
Members of the Parliament of Finland (1919–22)
Members of the Parliament of Finland (1922–24)
Members of the Parliament of Finland (1924–27)
Members of the Parliament of Finland (1927–29)
Members of the Parliament of Finland (1929–30)
Members of the Parliament of Finland (1930–33)
Members of the Parliament of Finland (1933–36)
Members of the Parliament of Finland (1936–39)
Members of the Parliament of Finland (1939–45)
People of the Finnish Civil War (White side)
Finnish people of World War II
Finnish astronomers
University of Helsinki alumni
Academic staff of the University of Helsinki